The Cagne is a river that flows through the Alpes-Maritimes department of southeastern France. Its source is near Coursegoules, and it flows into the Mediterranean Sea in Cagnes-sur-Mer. The Malvan is one of its tributaries.

References

Rivers of France
Rivers of Alpes-Maritimes
Rivers of Provence-Alpes-Côte d'Azur
0Cagne